Ralph Labrosse (born 4 August 1958) is a Seychellois boxer. He competed in the men's light middleweight event at the 1984 Summer Olympics.

References

1958 births
Living people
Seychellois male boxers
Olympic boxers of Seychelles
Boxers at the 1984 Summer Olympics
Place of birth missing (living people)
Light-middleweight boxers